Abdul Razzaq Baloch (born 10 August 1936) is a former Pakistani cyclist. He competed in the sprint at the 1960 Summer Olympics.

References

External links
 

1936 births
Living people
Pakistani male cyclists
Olympic cyclists of Pakistan
Cyclists at the 1960 Summer Olympics
Sportspeople from Karachi
Asian Games medalists in cycling
Cyclists at the 1958 Asian Games
Medalists at the 1958 Asian Games
Asian Games silver medalists for Pakistan
20th-century Pakistani people